Abdul Karim Ohimai Amu (13 November 1933 – 9 February 2010) was a Nigerian athlete who mainly competed in the 400m and 4 x 100 meters relay. He was a former president of the Athletics Federation of Nigeria.

Life
By the age of 17, Amu was already a good athlete. He was educated at King's College where his athletic ability brought national attention. In the Grier Cup held at Ijebu-Ode in 1952, Amu won the 100 and 440 yards. In addition, he played for the King's College hockey team and was a member of Nigerian team in an inter-colonial hockey competition held in the Gold Coast. His first major international competition was the 1954 Commonwealth Games held in Vancouver. He competed in the 100m, 200m and 4 × 100 m relay events and was part of Nigeria's relay team that clocked 41.3 to earn a silver at the games. In the 220 yard, he reached the semi-final. He enrolled at University of Ibadan in 1955.

In 1956, he was a member of the University of Ibadan athletic club when he represented Nigeria at the 1956 Summer Olympics in the 400 and 4 x 100 relay events. Nigeria did not medal at the event and the relay team which was formidable dropped the baton and did not finish. In 1960, he was the vice-captain of the Nigerian athletics team to the 1960 Summer Olympics in Rome, once again, he was in the 400m and 4 × 100 m relay team. He reached the semi-finals of the 400m event but the relay team had a baton mixup in the semi-final and did not finish.
 
In 1964, he was captain of the athletics team to the 1964 Summer Olympics in Tokyo. Amu set a national record in the 220 yard dash that lasted for 16 years.

References

External links 
 
 
 

1933 births
2010 deaths
Nigerian male sprinters
Olympic athletes of Nigeria
Athletes (track and field) at the 1956 Summer Olympics
Athletes (track and field) at the 1960 Summer Olympics
Athletes (track and field) at the 1964 Summer Olympics
Athletes (track and field) at the 1954 British Empire and Commonwealth Games
Commonwealth Games silver medallists for Nigeria
Commonwealth Games medallists in athletics
Medallists at the 1954 British Empire and Commonwealth Games